Robert Pitofsky (December 27, 1929 – October 6, 2018) was an American lawyer and politician who was the chairman of the Federal Trade Commission of the United States from April 11, 1995, to May 31, 2001. He had previously been Dean of the Georgetown University Law Center from 1983 to 1989, and was Dean Emeritus at the time of his death.

Early life and education 
Born and raised in Paterson, New Jersey, Pitofsky attended Eastside High School. Pitofsky was educated at New York University and the Columbia University School of Law.

Federal Trade Commission (FTC) 
Before becoming chairman of the FTC on April 12, 1995, he previously held positions with the FTC as a Commissioner (1978–1981) and as Director of the Bureau of Consumer Protection (1970–1973). Pitofsky was the primary author of one of the most widely used casebooks in the area of trade regulation, now in its sixth edition.

Personal life 
Pitofsky was married and has three children and seven grandchildren. He died at the age of 88 on October 6, 2018.

Publications
Books:
Cases and Materials on Trade Regulation (Foundation Press 5th ed. 2003) (with others).
"How the Chicago School Overshot the Mark" (Oxford Univ. Press 2008) (Pitofsky, ed.).

Articles:
"Antitrust at the Turn of the Twenty-first Century: the Matter of Remedies," 91 Geo. L.J. 169 (2002).
"Antitrust and Intellectual Property: Unresolved Issues at the Heart of the New Economy," 34 Intell. Prop. L. Rev. 643 (2002), reprinting 16 Berkeley Tech L.J. 535 (2001).
"The Essential Facilities Doctrine Under United States Antitrust Law," 70 Antitrust L.J. 443 (2002) (with others).

"The Political Content of Antitrust," 127 U. Penn. L. Rev. 1050 (1979).
"Beyond Nader: Consumer Protection and the Regulation of Advertising," 90 Harv. L. Rev. 661 (1977).

See also 
 List of former FTC commissioners

References

External links
Georgetown University memoriam for Robert Pitofsky
FTC page listing speeches and testimony by Robert Pitofsky
Biographies of FTC commissioners as of 1996

1929 births
2018 deaths
Georgetown University Law Center faculty
New York University alumni
Columbia Law School alumni
Scholars of competition law
Deans of law schools in the United States
Federal Trade Commission personnel
American legal scholars
Carter administration personnel
Reagan administration personnel
Clinton administration personnel
George W. Bush administration personnel
People from Paterson, New Jersey
Eastside High School (Paterson, New Jersey) alumni
Deans of Georgetown University Law Center